The Rahad is a river whose sources are in Ethiopia, where it is called Shinfa, and a tributary of the Abay (Blue Nile) on the right side. The river has its origins in the Ethiopian Highlands (west of Lake Tana), from where it flows  into eastern Sudan. In Sudan, it merges into the Blue Nile.

A black-maned Sudan lion was described from this river.

See also
 Er Rahad
 List of rivers of Ethiopia

References

Rivers of Ethiopia
Tributaries of the Blue Nile
Ethiopian Highlands
Rivers of Sudan
International rivers of Africa